Erica pyramidalis, the pyramid heath, was a species of Erica that was endemic to the city of Cape Town, South Africa. It was driven to extinction by the early 20th century, due to habitat destruction from the expanding city.

References

pyramidalis
Extinct plants
Extinct biota of Africa
Flora of the Cape Provinces
Natural history of Cape Town
Species endangered by urbanization
Species made extinct by human activities